Nicolini may refer to:

 15386 Nicolini, main-belt asteroid named after the astronomer Martino Nicolini

People 
 Stage name of Nicolo Grimaldi (1673–1732), Italian mezzo-soprano castrato
 Angelo Nicolini (1505–1567), Italian cardinal
 Bruno Nicolini (born 1969), civil name of the French singer Bénabar
 Elena Nicolini (born 1988), Italian ski mountaineer
 Emanuele Nicolini (1984), Sammarinese swimmer
 Enrico Nicolini (born 1955), Italian former professional footballer and manager
 Ernesto Nicolini (1834–1898), French operatic tenor
 Franco Nicolini (born 1960), Italian ski mountaineer, mountain guide and mountain rescue instructor
 Giuseppe Nicolini (composer) (1762–1842), Italian composer
 Giuseppe Nicolini (sculptor) (1855–?), Italian sculptor
 Giuseppe Nicolini (writer) (1788–1855), Italian writer
 Giuseppe Placido Nicolini O.S.B. (1877–1973), Roman Catholic Bishop of Assisi
 Gregorio González Nicolini (born 1974), Chilean film producer and financial engineer
 Ignacio Nicolini (born 1988), Uruguayan footballer
 Jill Nicolini (born 1978), American model, actress and reality TV show participant
 Michelle Nicolini (born 1982), Brazilian Jiu-Jitsu practitioner and mixed martial artist

See also

Italian-language surnames
Patronymic surnames
Surnames from given names